Heng Sure (恆實法師, Pinyin: Héng Shí, birth name Christopher R. Clowery; born October 31, 1949) is an American Chan Buddhist monk. He is a senior disciple of Hsuan Hua, and is currently the director of the Berkeley Buddhist Monastery, a branch monastery of the Dharma Realm Buddhist Association. He is probably best known for a pilgrimage he made for two years and six months from 1977–1979. Called a three steps, one bow pilgrimage, Heng Sure and his companion Heng Chau (Martin Verhoeven), bowed from South Pasadena to Ukiah, California, a distance of 800 miles, seeking world peace.

Born in Toledo, Ohio, he attended DeVilbiss High School, Oakland University in Rochester, Michigan, and the University of California at Berkeley from 1971–1976. During his time at the university, Heng Sure was active in theatre. At an early age, Heng Sure learned Chinese from studying the language in high school and by means of his sister, who worked at the U.S. Information Agency. After receiving his masters in Oriental languages, he met his teacher, Hsuan Hua, who would later ordain him in 1976 at the City of Ten Thousand Buddhas, as "Heng Sure" a Dharma name which means "Constantly Real." 
Heng Sure earned an MA degree in Oriental Languages from the University of California, Berkeley, in 1976 and a PhD in Religion from the Graduate Theological Union, Berkeley, in 2003.

Heng Sure currently gives lectures in Berkeley to the public and through webcasts. Heng Sure also gives lectures in many parts of the world on various subjects, such as the sutras and veganism. He is also an accomplished musician and guitarist.

In 2008, Heng Sure published his first music CD "Paramita: American Buddhist Folk Songs".

In October 2018, he participated in the Fifth World Buddhist Forum held in Putian, Fujian Province of China, and at the closing ceremony, read with the patriarchal Zongxing the Declaration of the Fifth World Buddhist Forum.

References

External links 
 Rev. Heng Sure's blog
 Rev. Heng Sure on Facebook
 Dharma Radio—lectures and music.
 Bowing Journals and Photos
  With One Heart Bowing—essay on the first time they publicly shared stories about their pilgrimage
 American Pilgrimage - Three Steps, One Bow for Peace
Rev. Heng Sure on Veganism

Chan Buddhist monks
American Zen Buddhists
Dharma Realm Buddhist Association
Oakland University alumni
Musicians from Toledo, Ohio
Performers of Buddhist music
University of California, Berkeley alumni
Converts to Buddhism
1949 births
Living people
Guitarists from Ohio
American male guitarists
20th-century American guitarists
20th-century American male musicians